is a women's football club playing in Japan's football league, Nadeshiko League Division 2. Its hometown is the city of Tsukuba.

Squad

Current squad

Results

References

External links
 official site
 Japanese Club Teams

Women's football clubs in Japan
Association football clubs established in 1991
1991 establishments in Japan
Tsukuba, Ibaraki
Sports teams in Ibaraki Prefecture